Mauricio "El Pica” Aguiar (born February 3, 1983, in Montevideo) is a Uruguayan professional basketball player. He is a longtime member of the Uruguay national basketball team and is currently playing professionally with Hebraica y Macabi of the Uruguayan Liga Uruguaya de Basketball

Professional career
Aguiar began his career for the Uruguay basketball league in 2000.  He spent his first three years (2000–03) playing with Uruguayan team Cordon Atletico. After three solid seasons with the team, Aguiar declared for the 2003 NBA Draft.  However, he went undrafted.

Following this, Aguiar moved to Italy to continue his career with Lauretana Biella of the Italian League. He saw little action off the bench in two seasons with the team, averaging only 4.0 points and 0.8 rebounds per game his first season and 5.3 points and 0.9 rebounds per game his second season.

Since 2006, Aguiar has bounced between teams in Uruguay and teams in Italy.  In his most recent season, 2008–09, he began the year with Club Biguá in Uruguay, averaging 8.8 points and 3 rebounds per game for the club in the 2008-09 Americas League while playing alongside fellow Uruguay national basketball team members Leandro Garcia Morales and Martin Osimani.  In April, he was signed by Italian team Vanoli Soresina for the last 16 games of the team's season.  Aguiar quickly jumped into the team's rotation, averaging 9.2 points and 21.3 minutes per game for the season.  Following the season, the team extended his contract for the 2009-10 season.

National team career
Aguiar is a long-time member of the Uruguayan national basketball team.  He has been selected for the Uruguayans for the last four continental championships, the 2003, 2005, 2007, and FIBA Americas Championship 2009.

References

External links
FIBA Profile
Latinbasket.com Profile
Italian League Profile 
RealGM profile

1983 births
Living people
Basketball players at the 2003 Pan American Games
Basketball players at the 2007 Pan American Games
Ciclista Olímpico players
Club Biguá de Villa Biarritz basketball players
Ferro Carril Oeste basketball players
Obras Sanitarias basketball players
Pallacanestro Biella players
Pan American Games bronze medalists for Uruguay
Regatas Corrientes basketball players
Sport Club Corinthians Paulista basketball players
Sportspeople from Montevideo
Uruguayan expatriate basketball people in Brazil
Uruguayan expatriate basketball people in Italy
Uruguayan men's basketball players
Vanoli Cremona players
Pan American Games medalists in basketball
Forwards (basketball)
Medalists at the 2007 Pan American Games
20th-century Uruguayan sportspeople
21st-century Uruguayan sportspeople